The Big Ten baseball tournament is the conference championship tournament in baseball for the NCAA Division I Big Ten Conference.  The winner of the tournament receives the conference's automatic bid to the NCAA Division I baseball tournament.

History
The Big Ten baseball tournament began in 1981.  From 1981 to 1999, the tournament was a 4-team double-elimination tournament.  In 2000, the tournament expanded to a 6-team double elimination format. Beginning in 2014, it will be an 8-team double elimination tournament.

From 1981 until 1987, the Big Ten Conference was split into two divisions, named the 'East' and the 'West'.  The top two teams in each division at the end of the regular season participated in the tournament.  In 1988, the conference eliminated the divisions, and the top four teams in the conference played in the tournament, until 2000 when it was expanded to 6 teams.  Beginning in 2014, the field expanded to eight teams.

Champions

By year

By school
Updated as of 2022 season

References

 
Recurring sporting events established in 1981